Cezary Stanisław Grabarczyk  (born 26 April 1960) is a Polish politician.

He was elected to the Sejm on 25 September 2005, getting 13,775 votes in the 11th Sieradz district.  He stood for election as a candidate on the Civic Platform list. Again elected to the Sejm in the 2007 Polish parliamentary election, in which he received 44,610 votes in the Łódź district.

Following the 2007 parliamentary election, Grabarczyk was Minister of Infrastructure from November 2007 to November 2011, under Prime Minister Donald Tusk. After the 2011 parliamentary election, he was elected to serve as one of the deputy marshals (vicepresidents) of the Sejm. From 2013 to 2016 he was deputy leader of Civic Platform. From September 2014 to April 2016 he served as Minister of Justice, but got dismissed after controversy aroused around his firearms licence. He regained his parliamentary seat after 2015 parliamentary election.

See also
Members of Polish Sejm 2005-2007
Members of Polish Sejm 2007-2011

External links
Cezary Grabarczyk - parliamentary page - includes declarations of interest, voting record, and transcripts of speeches.

1960 births
Living people
Politicians from Łódź
Justice ministers of Poland
Transport ministers of Poland
Deputy Marshals of the Sejm of the Third Polish Republic
Members of the Polish Sejm 2001–2005
Members of the Polish Sejm 2005–2007
Members of the Polish Sejm 2007–2011
Members of the Polish Sejm 2011–2015
Members of the Polish Sejm 2015–2019
Members of the Polish Sejm 2019–2023
Civic Platform politicians
University of Łódź alumni